Robert Faas (3 April 1889 – 9 January 1966) was a German international footballer.

References

1889 births
1966 deaths
Association football goalkeepers
German footballers
Germany international footballers
German military personnel of World War I